The year 1907 was marked, in science fiction, by the following events.

Births and deaths

Births 
 July 7 : Robert A. Heinlein, American writer (died 1988)
 November 27 : Lyon Sprague de Camp, American writer (died 2000)

Deaths

Events

Awards 
The main science-fiction Awards known at the present time did not exist at this time.

Literary releases

Novels

Stories collections

Short stories

Comics

Audiovisual outputs

Movies 
 Under the Seas (in French : Vingt mille lieues sous les mers), by Georges Méliès.

See also 
 1907 in science
 1906 in science fiction
 1908 in science fiction

References

science-fiction
Science fiction by year